Mian may refer to:

People and languages 
Mian (surname), including a list of people with the surname
Mian (given name), including a list of people with the given name
Mian family of Baghbanpura, a noble Arain family of Lahore, Pakistan
Mian people, people in Telefomin district, Sanduan province, Papua New Guinea
Mian language, spoken in Telefomin district, Sanduan, Papua New Guinea
Mian people (Australia), an indigenous people of Queensland
Mian (tribe), a Pakistani Punjabi community

Places 

Mian, Punjab, a village in Mansa district, Indian Punjab
 Mian Channu, a city in Khanewal District, Pakistani Punjab
 Mian Channu Tehsil, an administrative subdivision of Khanewal District, Pakistani Punjab
 Mian Wali Qureshian, a town in Rahim Yar Khan District, Pakistani Punjab
 Mian (Amieva), a parish in Amieva, Spain
 Mian County, a county of Hanzhong, Shaanxi, China
 Mian Deh, Badakhshan, Afghanistan

Other 
 Mian (title), a historical title of the Indian subcontinent, similar to the British "Lord"
 Miah, a Bengali word of similar origin
 Steklov Institute of Mathematics
 Mian–Chowla sequence, in mathematics
 Mian Quan, a martial arts in Hebei province of northern China

Language and nationality disambiguation pages